Carl Andreas August Goos (6 August 1797, Schleswig - 12 July 1855, Schleswig) was a German-Danish painter working in history painting, genre painting and portrait painting.

External links 
 

1797 births
1855 deaths
19th-century German painters
19th-century Danish painters
Danish male painters
Danish genre painters
German genre painters
Danish landscape painters
German landscape painters
19th-century painters of historical subjects
German portrait painters
Danish portrait painters
People from Schleswig, Schleswig-Holstein
19th-century German male artists
19th-century Danish male artists